Vermette is a surname. Notable people with the surname include:

Antoine Vermette (born 1982), Canadian ice hockey player
Cécile Vermette (born 1945), Canadian nurse and politician
Claude Vermette (1930–2006), Canadian ceramist and painter
Doyle Vermette, Canadian politician
Katherena Vermette, Canadian writer and poet
Mark Vermette (born 1967), Canadian ice hockey player
Patrice Vermette, Canadian production designer and art director
Rhayne Vermette, Canadian filmmaker